is a railway station on the Kagoshima Main Line, operated by JR Kyushu in Ōmuta, Fukuoka Prefecture, Japan.

Lines 
Only local services on the line stop at the station.

Layout 
The station consists of two side platforms serving two tracks. The station building is a small shed which houses a ticket window, an automatic ticket vending machine, a Sugoca charge machine and card reader. There is no waiting room but seats are provided at the shelters on the platforms. Access to the opposite side platform is by means of a footbridge.

Since 2010, the staffing of the ticket window has been entrusted to the Ōmuta Tourist Association. The ticket window is equipped with a POS machine but does not have a Midori no Madoguchi facility.

Adjacent stations

History
JR Kyushu opened the station on 16 March 1991 as an additional station on the existing track of the Kagoshima Main Line.

Passenger statistics
In fiscal 2016, the station was used by an average of 491 passengers daily (boarding passengers only), and it ranked 247th among the busiest stations of JR Kyushu.

References

External links
Yoshino Station (JR Kyushu)

Railway stations in Fukuoka Prefecture
Railway stations in Japan opened in 1991